Robert Dormer may refer to:

Robert Dormer, 1st Baron Dormer (1551–1616)
Robert Dormer, 1st Earl of Carnarvon (1610–1643)
Robert Dormer (MP for Wycombe) (1485–1552), MP for Chipping Wycombe, 1529
Robert Dormer (1650–1726), Member of Parliament for Aylesbury, Buckinghamshire and Northallerton